Adnane Remmal (Arabic: عَدنان رِمَّال) is a Moroccan pharmacology professor, senior researcher and entrepreneur in the field of biotechnology at the University of Fez, Morocco. He was born 1962 in Fez, Morocco. His works focus on fighting antimicrobial resistance, one of the major threats to public health in both developed and emerging countries. Among other results, he has successfully patented a solution to boost antibiotics against antibiotic-resistant bacteria, and an alternative to replace antibiotics in poultry feed.  In 2017, he was the recipient of the European Patent Office (EPO) Popular Prize category award. EPO President Benoît Battistelli declared "The public vote for Adnane Remmal recognises his contribution to fighting the growing threat of antibiotic-resistant microbes."

Awards and honours 

 2015: Professor Remmal was awarded the innovation prize for Africa by the AIF, a Switzerland based foundation.
 2017: Professor Remmal was the winner of the European Inventor Award organized by the European Patent Office (EPO) in the Popular Prize category.
 2017: Professor Remmal was decorated by King Mohammed VI of Morocco with the kingdom’s highest honor, the Order of Ouissam Alaouite (“Al Kafaa Al Fikriya” (Intellectual merit)) for his significant scientific and academic achievements.

Education 
Adnane Remmal was born in the millennial city of Fez, Morocco in February 1962.  He studied in Morocco until the second year of university. In 1982, he was admitted to pursue his studies in the leading scientific center of Orsay (University of Paris XI). In 1984, he joined Pr Edouard Coraboeuf’s team with whom he received his electrophysiology and cardiovascular pharmacology postgraduate diploma. He then joined the team of Pr Philippe Meyer at Necker hospital in Paris for his PhD in molecular pharmacology. In 1987, he received his PhD and decided to leave France to explore scientific research projects in Morocco. He was already aware that antibiotic resistance was a major threat in the country and around the world.

Career 
In 1988, Remmal became a Professor and researcher at the University of Fez, Morocco, where he taught several among which cellular biology, microbiology and molecular biology. At the outset of his research on antibiotics resistance, he worked closely with other researchers from Moroccan and international institutions.  His first results in fundamental research on the antimicrobial activity of essential oils allowed him to receive a second PhD in Microbiology in 1994 (University of Fez).

For over years now, Adnane Remmal has dedicated his research to the development of useful and tangible solutions to treat patients with resistant infections on which the current treatments do not have any effect anymore, along with solutions to prevent resistance caused by the environment and the food chain as it is today. During all these years, Adnane Remmal has published dozens of academic papers and contributed to the training of dozens of young researchers during their masters and PhD degrees who are now active in different research centers in Morocco and abroad.

Remmal co-founded the companies Advanced Scientific Developments (ASD) and Industrial Laboratory of Agricultural and Veterinary Products (LIPAV)., ASD filed four patents to protect the concept of boosting anti-infectious agents; These four patents were delivered in different regions in the world. ASD also raised funds to continue research on the boosting mechanism and to conduct pre-clinical and clinical tests of boosted drugs.

References 

Living people
Sidi Mohamed Ben Abdellah University alumni
University of Paris alumni
Year of birth missing (living people)